2013 Beirut bombing may refer to:

July 2013 Beirut bombing
August 2013 Beirut bombing
Iranian embassy bombing in Beirut, in November
Assassination of Mohamad Chatah, in December